Jimmy Button (born June 14, 1973) is an American former professional motocross racer, born in Phoenix, Arizona. He competed in the AMA Motocross Championships from 1990 to 2000.

History 
 1992: Jimmy won his first pro race at the Charlotte and Indianapolis rounds of the AMA 125 East Region Supercross Series. 
 1994: Won the Daytona, Florida, Irving, Texas and Charlotte rounds of the AMA 125 East Region Supercross Series.
 1995: Finished 4th in the 125 World Motocross Championships.
 2000: On January 22, Button entered a whoop section of the track at the San Diego round of the 250 cc Supercross Series on his Yamaha YZ426 when he dropped the front wheel and went over the handle bars. The crash broke his neck and caused temporary paralysis. After months of rehabilitation, Button has regained his feeling and movement to live a normal life outside of racing. In July he helped found the Road 2 Recovery Foundation to help riders suffering from injuries like his. Jimmy also helped forum Action Sports Management to represent riders as an agent.

References

External links
 AMA Pro-Racing Bio
 RacerX Where Are They Now: Jimmy Button

1973 births
Living people
Sportspeople from Phoenix, Arizona
American motocross riders